One Day at a Time (later retitled One Day at a Time - Uplifting Songs of Faith and Inspiration) is a studio album by American Christian and country music singer Cristy Lane. It was first released in December 1981 via LS Records. It was Lane's eighth studio project in her music career and her first album of entirely Christian material. Included on the album was Lane's number one single, "One Day at a Time", along with covers of various gospel hymns. The record charted in various countries following its 1981 release.

In 1983, Lane's biography was released and sold on television in conjunction with One Day at a Time. The television advertisements brought increased sales to the album and it was re-released on several occasions. In 1982, it was released via Liberty Records and in 1983 on Arrival Records. Later in the decade, the album was released in a CD format with additional tracks added, while others were omitted.

Background and content
In the late 1970s and early 1980s, Cristy Lane had several major hit singles on the North American country charts with songs like "Let Me Down Easy" and "I Just Can't Stay Married to You". In 1980, the Christian song "One Day at a Time" reached number one on the Billboard country singles chart and became the biggest hit of her career. The song influenced Lane to transition her music career towards the Christian market. Her 1981 One Day at a Time LP would be her first Christian-themed project following the song's success. The album's original track listing was a collection of 18 Christian and gospel songs, including the title tune. Also featured on the project was Lane's interpretations of traditional Christian hymns like "Amazing Grace", "Just a Closer Walk with Thee", "Rock of Ages" and "In the Garden". When the album was re-released, several recordings were omitted, limiting the track listing to 12 songs. One Day at a Time was first recorded between and November and December 1980 in sessions held in Nashville, Tennessee. The sessions were produced by Ron Oates.

Release and chart performance
One Day at a Time was originally released in December 1981 on LS Records. It was originally offered as a vinyl LP, containing nine songs on both sides of the record. The original project was sold on television. In 1983, Lane's biography book was released in conjunction with the re-release of the album on Arrival Records. The re-release only included 14 songs. Both the book and album were sold on television through direct marketing advertisements in an eight-dollar combination package. Nine cable networks and 120 affiliate television stations aired Lane's album. Through direct television marketing, the album has been estimated to have sold over one million records. 

In 1986, LS Records re-released the album with different track listing in a cassette format. The new release featured the recordings "Ave Maria" and "I Love You More Everyday". Through Capitol Records's "EMI Music Special Markets" division, One Day at a Time was re-issued in 1988 and again in 1989. The track listing on the 1988 version featured two of Lane's Christian-themed singles that had not been issued on prior releases of the album. Both "I Have a Dream" and "Footprints in the Sand" were featured on the Capitol release. They were also featured on the 1989 CD release. A digital version of the Capitol LP was released decades later.

The original 1981 album on LS Records would become Lane's first to reach a peak position on the Billboard Top Christian Albums chart, peaking at number 17. It was also her first album to reach a peak position on the New Zealand albums chart, peaking in the top ten at number six.

Track listings

Original version

1982 version

1983 version

1986 version

1988 version

1995 CD/Cassette release

1989/2008 CD and digital versions

Charts

Release history

References

Footnotes

Books

 
 

1981 albums
1982 albums
1983 albums
1986 albums
1989 albums
Capitol Records albums
Cristy Lane albums
Liberty Records albums
LS Records albums